Crețulescu or Kretzulescu may refer to:

Romanian surname
Constantin A. Crețulescu (1809–1884), academic and politician
Catherine Caradja (née Ecaterina Olimpia Crețulescu; 1893–1993), aristocrat and philanthropist
Emanuel Crețulescu (born 1992), football player
Ilie Crețulescu (1892–1971), army officer
Nicolae Crețulescu (1812–1900), politician and physician

Other uses
Crețulescu Palace, a palace in Bucharest
Kretzulescu Church, a Romanian Orthodox church in Bucharest

Romanian-language surnames